Zhao Jingnan (born 7 March 1995) is a Chinese rhythmic gymnast. She competed in the group rhythmic gymnastics competition at the 2016 Summer Olympics, where the team was eliminated in the qualification round.

References

Living people
1995 births
People from Liaoning
Sportspeople from Liaoning
Gymnasts from Liaoning
Chinese rhythmic gymnasts
Gymnasts at the 2016 Summer Olympics
Olympic gymnasts of China
21st-century Chinese women